The Last Fight is a 1983 American film directed by Fred Williamson.

Plot
A singer-turned-boxer signs a contract with a shady promoter. The boxer turns against the promoter and seeks revenge when the promoter's thugs kill his girlfriend when he tries backing out of the contract.

Cast
 Willie Colón as Joaquin Vargas 
 Rubén Blades as Andy "Kid" Clave 
 Fred Williamson as Jesse Crowder
 Darlanne Fluegel as Sally 
 Anthony Sirico as Frankie 
 Joe Spinell as Angelo, The Boss 
 Nereida Mercado as Nancy 
 Vinny Argiro as Detective Pantano 
 Sal Carollo as Papa 
 Andy Gerado as Frank 
 Izzy Sanabria as Slim 
 Alex Stevens as Sal 
 Kurt Andon as Doctor 
 Marta Viana as Mama 
 Darlene Masucci as Pretty Girl At Party 
 Salvador Sánchez as himself
 Don King as himself
 José Torres as himself
 Bert Sugar as himself (credited as "Bert Sugarman")
 Tony Perez as himself

References

External links

1983 films
American boxing films
Films directed by Fred Williamson
1980s English-language films
1980s American films